Jacqueline "Jacqui" Lawrence (born 25 April 1982 in Cooma, New South Wales) is an Australian slalom canoeist and Olympic silver medallist, from Old Bonalbo, New South Wales. She competed at the international level from 2000 to 2008.

At the 2008 Summer Olympics, she won silver in the K1 event at the Shunyi Olympic Rowing-Canoeing Park.

Her younger sisters Katrina and Rosalyn are also slalom canoeists and in the Olympic trials, Jacqui had to defeat Kate for a place on the Australian team.

Jacqui went to the University of New England in Armidale and was part of Drummond and Smith College.

World Cup individual podiums

1 Continental Cup Oceania counting for World Cup points
2 Oceania Championship counting for World Cup points

References

Australian Olympic Committee profile

1982 births
Australian female canoeists
Canoeists at the 2008 Summer Olympics
Living people
Olympic canoeists of Australia
Olympic silver medalists for Australia
Olympic medalists in canoeing
Sportswomen from New South Wales
People from the Northern Rivers
Australian Institute of Sport canoeists
Medalists at the 2008 Summer Olympics
People from Cooma
21st-century Australian women